Monoxenus bufoides is a species of beetle in the family Cerambycidae. It was described by Karl Jordan in 1894, originally under the genus Apomempsis.

References

bufoides
Beetles described in 1894